Tholaipesi is a Tamil language film starring Vikramaditya and Priyanka. The film was released on 24 August 2007 to become a flop.

Plot
The movie revolves around Vedachala, alias Veda, who continues to lead a playboy life even after his marriage with Anita. Thanks to his cellphone, Anita discovers his illicit affair with Reema. Life takes a turn for Veda. Whether he sets his house in order forms the crux.

Cast
Vikramaditya as Vedachala
Priyanka Nair as Anitha 
Divya as Reema
Aarthi
Nizhalgal Ravi
Karunas
Lavanya
Madan Bob
Prem

Soundtrack
Soundtrack was composed by debutant Shanthakumar.
"En Pagaivan" - Saindhavi
"Magic" - Ranjith
"Un Manathai" - Prasanna, Sangeetha
"Enna Venum" - Suchitra
"Nootukku Nooru" - SPB

Critical reception
Behindwoods wrote "Though the concept is interesting, the lack of depth in the story and the ambiguous screenplay plays spoilsport. Director K Paneerselvam’s inexperience is revealed when many scenes end abruptly." Indiaglitz wrote "Paneerselvam needs to be commended for thinking out-of-the-box. Unfortunately the execution goes haywire. The second half is too lengthy."

References

2007 films
2000s Tamil-language films